Elpidio is a male given name and may refer to following persons:
 Elpídio Barbosa Conceição (born 1974), Brazilian footballer
 Elpidio "Pidi" Barzaga Jr. (born 1950), Filipino politician
 Elpidio Concha (born 1963), Mexican politician
 Elpidio Coppa (1914-1978), Italian footballer
 Elpidio Donizetti, Brazilian jurist
 Elpidio González (1875–1951), Argentine politician
 Elpidio Quirino (1890–1956), Filipino politician and former president of the Philippines
 Elpidio Silva (born 1975), Brazilian footballer
 Elpidio Tovar (born 1949), Mexican politician
 Elpidio Villamin (born 1958), Filipino basketball player

See also

 Elpidius (disambiguation)
 Sant'Elpidio (disambiguation)

Italian masculine given names
Portuguese masculine given names
Spanish masculine given names